Carlos Mario Álvarez Sánchez (born 12 September 1956) is a Cuban sprinter. He competed in the men's 4 × 400 metres relay at the 1976 Summer Olympics. He won a silver medal at the 1975 Pan American Games in the 4 x 400 metres relay.

References

External links

1956 births
Living people
Athletes (track and field) at the 1976 Summer Olympics
Cuban male sprinters
Olympic athletes of Cuba
Pan American Games silver medalists for Cuba
Pan American Games medalists in athletics (track and field)
Athletes (track and field) at the 1975 Pan American Games
Athletes (track and field) at the 1979 Pan American Games
Medalists at the 1975 Pan American Games
Medalists at the 1979 Pan American Games
Central American and Caribbean Games medalists in athletics
20th-century Cuban people